The Grand-Place ("Grand Square") is the main square and the centre of activity of Tournai, Hainaut, Belgium.

As in many Belgian cities, there are a number of cafés and pubs on the Grand-Place. In the middle of the square there are a series of water fountains, while a circular staircase to the top of the city's Belfry can be climbed.

Buildings
 The Belfry of Tournai, a freestanding bell tower of medieval origin,  in height with a 256-step stairway. Since 2005, it is recognised as a World Heritage Site by UNESCO, as part of the bi-national inscription "Belfries of Belgium and France" in recognition of its architecture and importance in the history of municipal power in Europe.
 The Cloth Hall, a building originally constructed in 1610 in Renaissance style to replace a first 13th-century wooden hall. It was rebuilt identically in 1881 following its collapse.
 The Church of St. Quentin, a Catholic parish church in Romanesque style with Gothic elements, known to have existed since the 10th century. The current building was built around 1200, but has been altered several times throughout history. It contains important sculptures by the 15th-century sculptor Jean Delemer.
 The Princess of Epinoy statue, a bronze statue made in 1863 by the sculptor Aimable Dutrieux in honour of Marie-Christine de Lalaing, who defended the city against Alexander Farnese, Duke of Parma, in 1581.

References

Footnotes

Notes

Tournai
Squares in Belgium